The 1989–90 NCAA Division III men's ice hockey season began in October 1989 and concluded on March 24 of the following year. This was the 17th season of Division III college ice hockey.

Regular season

Season tournaments

Standings

Note: Mini-game are not included in final standings

1990 NCAA Tournament

Note: * denotes overtime period(s)

See also
 1989–90 NCAA Division I men's ice hockey season

References

External links

 
NCAA